Johannes J. Johannessen (May 13, 1872-November 14, 1915) was a sailor serving in the United States Navy who received the Medal of Honor for bravery.

Biography
Johannessen was born May 13, 1872, in Bodø, Norway and after immigrating to the United States he joined the navy.

He died November 14, 1915, and is buried in Cypress Hills National Cemetery Brooklyn, New York. His grave can be found in section 2, grave 7425.

Medal of Honor citation
Rank and organization: Chief Watertender, U.S. Navy. Born: 13 May 1872, Bodø, Norway. Enlisted at: Yokohama, Japan. G.O. No.: 182, 20 March 1905.

Citation:

Serving on board the U.S.S. Iowa, for extraordinary heroism at the time of the blowing out of the manhole plate of boiler D on board that vessel, 25 January 1905.

See also

List of Medal of Honor recipients during peacetime

References

External links

1872 births
1915 deaths
People from Bodø
Norwegian emigrants to the United States
United States Navy Medal of Honor recipients
United States Navy sailors
 Norwegian-born Medal of Honor recipients
Burials in New York (state)
Non-combat recipients of the Medal of Honor